Algorithmic inference gathers new developments in the statistical inference methods made feasible by the powerful computing devices widely available to any data analyst. Cornerstones in this field are computational learning theory, granular computing, bioinformatics, and, long ago, structural probability .
The main focus is on the algorithms which compute statistics rooting the study of a random phenomenon, along with the amount of data they must feed on to produce reliable results. This shifts the interest of mathematicians from the study of the distribution laws to the functional properties of the statistics, and the interest of computer scientists from the algorithms for processing data to the information they process.

The Fisher parametric inference problem 
Concerning the identification of the parameters of a distribution law, the mature reader may recall lengthy disputes in the mid 20th century about the interpretation of their variability in terms of fiducial distribution , structural probabilities , priors/posteriors , and so on. From an epistemology viewpoint, this entailed a companion dispute as to the nature of probability: is it a physical feature of phenomena to be described through random variables or a way of synthesizing data about a phenomenon? Opting for the latter, Fisher defines a fiducial distribution law of parameters of a given random variable that he deduces from a sample of its specifications. With this law he computes, for instance “the probability that μ (mean of a Gaussian variable – omeur note) is less than any assigned value, or the probability that it lies between any assigned values, or, in short, its probability distribution, in the light of the sample observed”.

The classic solution 
Fisher fought hard to defend the difference and superiority of his notion of parameter distribution in comparison to 
analogous notions, such as  Bayes' posterior distribution, Fraser's constructive probability and Neyman's confidence intervals. For half a century, Neyman's confidence intervals  won out for all practical purposes, crediting the phenomenological nature of probability. With this perspective, when you deal with a Gaussian variable, its mean μ is fixed by the physical features of the phenomenon you are observing, where the observations are random operators, hence the observed values are specifications of a random sample. Because of their randomness, you may compute from the sample specific intervals containing the fixed μ with a given probability that you denote confidence.

Example 
Let X be a Gaussian variable with parameters  and  
and  a sample drawn from it. Working with statistics

 

and

 

is the sample mean, we recognize that

 

follows a Student's t distribution  with parameter (degrees of freedom) m − 1, so that

 

With the  sample specification:

Inferring functions with the help of a computer 
From a modeling perspective the entire dispute looks like a chicken-egg dilemma: either fixed data by first and probability distribution of their properties as a consequence, or fixed properties by first and probability distribution of the observed data as a corollary.
The classic solution has one benefit and one drawback. The former was appreciated particularly back  when people still did computations with  sheet and pencil. Per se, the task of computing a Neyman  confidence interval for the fixed parameter θ is hard: you don’t know θ, but you look for disposing around it an interval with a possibly very low probability of failing. The analytical solution is allowed for a very limited number of theoretical cases.  Vice versa a large variety of instances may be quickly solved in an approximate way via the central limit theorem in terms of confidence interval around a Gaussian distribution – that's the benefit. 
The drawback is that the central limit theorem is applicable when the sample size is sufficiently large. Therefore, it is less and less applicable with the sample involved in modern inference instances. The fault is not in the sample size on its own part. Rather, this size is not sufficiently large because of the complexity of the inference problem.

With the availability of large computing facilities,  scientists refocused from isolated parameters inference to complex functions inference, i.e. re sets of highly nested parameters identifying functions. In these cases we speak about learning of functions (in terms for instance of regression, neuro-fuzzy system or computational learning) on the basis of highly informative samples. A first effect of having a complex structure linking data is the reduction of the number of sample degrees of freedom, i.e. the burning of a part of sample points, so that the effective sample size to be considered in the central limit theorem is too small. Focusing  on the sample size ensuring a limited learning error with a given confidence level, the consequence is that the  lower bound on this size grows with complexity indices such as VC dimension or detail of a class to which the function we want to learn belongs.

Example 
A sample of 1,000 independent bits is enough to ensure an absolute error of at most 0.081 on the estimation of the parameter p of the underlying Bernoulli variable with a confidence of at least 0.99. The same size cannot guarantee a threshold less than 0.088 with the same confidence 0.99 when the error is identified with the probability that a 20-year-old man living in New York does not fit the ranges of height, weight and waistline observed on 1,000 Big Apple inhabitants. The accuracy shortage occurs because both the VC dimension and the detail of the class of parallelepipeds, among which the one observed from the 1,000 inhabitants' ranges falls, are equal to 6.

The general inversion problem solving the Fisher question 
With insufficiently large samples, the approach: fixed sample – random properties suggests inference procedures in three steps:

Definition
For a random variable and a sample drawn from it a compatible distribution is a distribution having the same sampling mechanism  of X with a value  of the random parameter  derived from a master equation rooted on a well-behaved statistic s.

Example 
You may find the distribution law of the Pareto parameters A and K as an implementation example of the population bootstrap method as in the figure on the left.

Implementing the twisting argument method,  you get the distribution  law  of the mean  M of a Gaussian variable X on the basis of the statistic  when  is known to be equal to  . Its expression is:

shown in the figure on the right, where  is the cumulative distribution function of  a standard normal distribution.
 
 Computing a confidence interval for M given its distribution function is straightforward: we need only find two quantiles (for instance  and  quantiles in case we are interested in a confidence interval of level δ symmetric in the tail's probabilities) as indicated  on the left in the diagram showing the behavior of the two bounds for different values of the statistic sm.

The Achilles heel of Fisher's approach lies in the joint distribution of more than one parameter, say mean and variance of a Gaussian distribution. For instance, focusing on the distribution of two or many more parameters, in the figures below we report two confidence regions where the function to be learnt falls with a confidence of 90%. The former concerns the probability with which an extended support vector machine attributes a binary label 1 to the points of the  plane. The two surfaces are drawn on the basis of a set of sample points in turn labelled according to a specific distribution law . The latter concerns the confidence region of the hazard rate of breast cancer recurrence computed from a censored sample .

Notes

References 

 
Machine learning